La Tempête ("the tempest") is a 1982 novel by the French writer René Barjavel. It is set in a near future during a chemically induced world peace, and follows a woman and a man in Paris who must find a future for humanity.

The narrative is inspired by the Biblical story of Judith and Holofernes. The book was published on 10 September 1982 through éditions Denoël.

References

External links
 Publicity page 

1982 French novels
1982 science fiction novels
French science fiction novels
Novels by René Barjavel
Novels set in Paris